The German-American Bank is a historic commercial building at Franklin and Main Streets in Altus, Arkansas.  It is a two-story masonry structure, built out of red brick with a stone foundation and trim.  It has an angled store entrance at the corner, sheltered by an overhang with a dentillated cornice and supported by a round column.  Windows on the second level are set in segmented-arch openings, and the flat roof is obscured by a raised brick parapet.  Built in 1905, it is Altus' finest example of commercial Italianate architecture.

The building was listed on the National Register of Historic Places in 1990.

See also
National Register of Historic Places listings in Franklin County, Arkansas

References

Bank buildings on the National Register of Historic Places in Arkansas
Italianate architecture in Arkansas
Buildings and structures in Franklin County, Arkansas
German-American culture in Arkansas
National Register of Historic Places in Franklin County, Arkansas